Senfronia Calpernia Thompson (born January 1, 1939) is a Democratic member of the Texas House of Representatives, representing the 141st District since 1972.

Thompson is the former Dean of Women Legislators in Texas. She has been elected to 25 terms in office. Thompson also advises the United Negro College Fund in Texas.

Biography 
 
Thompson was born in Booth, Texas and raised in Houston.

She holds multiple advanced college degrees. A Bachelor of Science in biology and a Master's degree in education from Texas Southern University; a Juris Doctor from the Thurgood Marshall School of Law; and a Master of Law in international law from the University of Houston. Thompson has two adult children, one grandson, one granddaughter and one great-granddaughter.

She represents HD 141, which covers northeast Houston and the Humble area.

Thompson is the dean of women legislators, having served longer in the legislature than any other woman or African-American person in Texas history. In October 2020, she filed to run for speaker of the Texas House, but the Republican Party retained control of the chamber in the November 2020 election. On May 30, 2021, she described her own family's struggles to exercise their right to vote to fellow Texas House Democrats as they strategized how to block Senate Bill 7. At 11:00 p.m., the Democrats staged a walkout of the House chamber to block a vote on the bill before the midnight deadline.

References

External links
Texas House of Representatives - Senfronia Thompson official TX House website
Senfronia Thompson For Speaker Of The House official campaign website
Project Vote Smart – Representative Senfronia Thompson (TX) profile
 Follow the Money – Senfronia Thompson
2006 2004 2002 2000 1998 campaign contributions
 Thompson, Senfronia and Florence Coleman. Senfronia Thompson Oral History, Houston Oral History Project, October 2, 1974.

 Members of the Texas House of Representatives
1939 births
 Living people
 Texas Democrats
 Texas Southern University alumni
 Thurgood Marshall School of Law alumni
 University of Houston alumni
 African-American state legislators in Texas
 Women state legislators in Texas
 African-American women in politics
21st-century American politicians
21st-century American women politicians
20th-century American politicians
20th-century American women politicians
 Politicians from Houston
 People from Fort Bend County, Texas
20th-century African-American women
20th-century African-American politicians
21st-century African-American women
21st-century African-American politicians